{{Infobox sports season
| title            = 2022 FINA Women's Water Polo World League
| league           = FINA Water Polo World League
| sport            = Water polo
| logo             =
| pixels           = 
| caption          =
| duration         = 25 January – 6 November
| no_of_teams      = 
| no_of_games      = 
| attendance       = 
| TV               =
| season           = 
| season_champs    = 
| MVP              =
| MVP_link         =
| top_scorer       = 
| top_scorer_link  =
| playoffs         = Super Final
| playoffs_link    = 
| finals           =
| finals_link      =
| finals_champ     =  (1st title)
| finals_runner-up = 
| finals_MVP       =  Rita Keszthelyi
| finals_MVP_link  =
| seasonslist      = FINA Women's Water Polo World League
| seasonslistnames = FINA Women's Water Polo World League
| prevseason_link  = 2020 FINA Women's Water Polo World League
| prevseason_year  = 2020
| nextseason_link  = 2023 FINA Women's Water Polo World League
| nextseason_year  = 2023
}}
The 2022 FINA Women's Water Polo World League was the 18th edition of the annual women's international water polo tournament, running from 25 January to 6 November 2022.

Spain won their first title after a win over Hungary.

European qualification round
The draw for the european qualification round was conducted in Lausanne, Switzerland on 17 November 2021.

First round
All six teams advanced to the second round of the European qualifications.

Group A

Group B

Second round
22–24 April 2022, Santa Cruz de Tenerife, Spain
The top-four European teams qualified for the Super Final. France replaced Russia.

Fifth place bracket

Intercontinental Cup
7–13 March 2022, Lima, Peru

Super final

Teams
As host country

Qualified teams

Invited teams

Preliminary roundAll times are local (UTC+1).''

Group A

Group B

Knockout stage

5th–8th place bracket

5–8th place semifinals

Seventh place game

Fifth place game

Championship bracket

Semifinals

Third place game

Final

Final ranking

References

External links
FINA website

FINA Women's Water Polo World League
World League, women